Carl "Bull" Reese is a former American football coach. Reese served as defensive coordinator for 31 years at six different schools and one United States Football League (USFL) team. In 2009, he accepted the defensive coordinator position at Miami (Ohio), under new head coach Michael Haywood. Reese and Haywood worked together previously at LSU in the 1990s.

While at Texas, Reese inherited a defense that ranked 104th nationally in rushing (241.5 ypg) and 85th nationally in total defense (399.2 ypg) in 1997 and turned it into a unit that produced five straight top 25 total defense finishes. Texas' NCAA-leading 236.2 yards per game allowed in 2001 was the Horns' lowest since 1983 (212.0 ypg). He was a 2001 finalist for the Broyles Award, given to the nation's top assistant coach. UT ranked sixth nationally in total defense in 1999 (286.7 ypg), seventh in 2000 (278.3 ypg) and 16th in 2002 (307.7 ypg).

In 2015, Reese joined Arkansas Razorbacks staff serving as an analyst for the team.

References

1940s births
Living people
American football fullbacks
American football linebackers
East Carolina Pirates football coaches
Kansas Jayhawks football coaches
LSU Tigers football coaches
Missouri Tigers football coaches
Missouri Tigers football players
Navy Midshipmen football coaches
Northern Michigan Wildcats football coaches
Southern Illinois Salukis football coaches
Vanderbilt Commodores football coaches
Virginia Cavaliers football coaches
Texas Longhorns football coaches
United States Football League coaches
Sportspeople from Missouri